The Crimson Circle (German: Der rote Kreis) is a 1960 West German/Danish black and white crime film directed by Jürgen Roland and starring Renate Ewert, Klausjürgen Wussow and Karl-Georg Saebisch. It was an adaptation of the 1922 novel The Crimson Circle by the British writer Edgar Wallace.

Plot
Scotland Yard detectives pursue a ruthless league of blackmailers known as The Crimson Circle.

Cast
 Renate Ewert as Thalia Drummond
 Klausjürgen Wussow as Derrick Yale
 Karl-Georg Saebisch as Inspector Parr
 Thomas Alder as Jack Beardmore
 Ernst Fritz Fürbringer as Sir Archibald Morton
 Erica Beer as Mrs. Carlyle
 Fritz Rasp as Froyant
 Eddi Arent as Sergeant Haggett
 Edith Mill as Lady Doringham
 Ulrich Beiger as Osborne
 Richard Lauffen as Marles
 Heinz Klevenow as Brabazon
 Alfred Schlageter as Mr Beardmore
 Panos Papadopulos as Sailor Selby
 Albert Watson as Sergeant Johnson
 Richard Grupe as James
 Karl-Heinz Peters as Executioner
 Friedrich Schütter as Henry Charles Lightman (and the masked head of the Crimson Circle)
 Alf Marholm as Prison warden
 Günter Hauer as Conductor
 Jürgen Roland as Policeman

Production
A previous German/British adaptation of the novel The Crimson Circle by Edgar Wallace was made in 1929. Other versions were produced in the UK in 1922 and in 1936.

For this version, the second film in the Wallace series produced by Rialto, the novel was adopted for the screen by Egon Eis under his pen name "Trygve Larsen". Wolfgang Menge, a friend of the director, made some changes to the script. Director Jürgen Roland had not previously directed a feature film, but had made a name for himself by directing the TV-series Stahlnetz.

Cinematography took place in November and December 1959. The studio for interiors was Palladium Atelier at Kopenhagen. Exteriors were also shot at Kopenhagen. Stock footage from London shot during production of the previous film Der Frosch mit der Maske was used.

Release
The FSK gave the film a rating of 16 years and up, unsuitable for screening on public holidays. It premiered on 2 March 1960 at the Unversum at Stuttgart.

The film's success encouraged the producers to meet with Penelope Wallace and secure the film rights for all available Wallace novels.

See also
 The Crimson Circle (1922)
 The Crimson Circle (1929)
 The Crimson Circle (1936)

References

External links

1960 films
1960s mystery films
1960s crime thriller films
German mystery films
German crime thriller films
West German films
1960s German-language films
Films directed by Jürgen Roland
Films based on British novels
Films based on works by Edgar Wallace
Films set in England
Films shot in Denmark
German black-and-white films
Remakes of British films
Constantin Film films
Films set in London
UFA GmbH films
1960s German films